Accismus is a feigned refusal of something earnestly desired.

The 1823 Encyclopædia Britannica writes that accismus may sometimes be considered a virtue, sometimes a vice.

The Latin term comes from the Greek word is "ἀκκισμός", which, according to Britannica, was "supposed to be formed from Acco (Greek: Akko), the name of a foolish old woman, famous in antiquity for an affectation of this kind." (An 1806 Lexicon manuale Graeco-Latinum et Latino-Graecum agrees with this derivation. However an 1820 Lexicon Graeco-Latinum associates Acco with idle occupation, e.g., chatting with other women or looking into a mirror, hence the Greek coinages Ακκιζειν / Ακκους).

More particularly, in rhetorics, accismus is a figure of speech, a figure of refutation, is a type of irony.

Examples
(behaviour) Britannica cites Oliver Cromwell's refusal of the crown of England as an example of accismus.
(behaviour) Merriam-Webster's Encyclopedia Of Literature cites the dismissal of the grapes by the fox in The Fox and the Grapes as an example 
When receiving gifts or honours, accismus is used to demonstrate modesty: "I am not worthy of the honor."
(ironic utterance) "I couldn't possibly accept such charity from you."

When being offered roles, accismus is used to demonstrate modesty: "I am not worthy of the role."
When being offered the authority as the owner of a paper clip (in an extreme case), accismus is used to demonstrate modesty: "I am not worthy of being the owner of a paper clip."
(ironic saying) "I couldn't possibly accept such welfare nor promotion from you."

See also
Sour grapes (disambiguation)

References

Figures of speech
Irony